This was the first edition of the tournament.

Bradley Klahn won the title after defeating Roy Smith 7–6(7–4), 7–6(7–4) in the final.

Seeds

Draw

Finals

Top half

Bottom half

References
Main Draw
Qualifying Draw

Oracle Challenger Series - Houston - Men's Singles
2018 Men's Singles